Oeax lichenea is a species of beetle in the family Cerambycidae. It was described by Duvivier in 1891.

References

Ancylonotini
Beetles described in 1891